John Kelso Ormond was an American urologist  who rediscovered retroperitoneal fibrosis (also known as Ormond's disease in 1948.)

Biography
He was born on March 25, 1886 in Armstrong County, Pennsylvania. He died February 25, 1978, in Ann Arbor, Michigan.

References

1886 births
1978 deaths
20th-century American physicians
American urologists
Physicians from Pennsylvania